Mahavelona (commonly called Foulpointe), is a town in the district of Toamasina II, in the region of Atsinanana, on the northern part of the east coast of Madagascar.

Geography
It is situated at the coast of the Indian Ocean south of the mouth of the Onibe River.  The town is located at 60 km north of Toamasina on the RN 5 between Toamasina and Maroantsetra. There is a reef around 150 metres out to sea which prevents waves hitting the beach; the waters by the shoreline are completely calm as a result.

Rivers
The Onibe river has its mouth at Foulpointe.

Economy
Its economy is based on tourism.

References

Populated places in Atsinanana